Maria Teresa Felicitas (6 October 1726 – 30 April 1754) was a Princess of Modena by birth and Duchess of Penthièvre by marriage. She was the mother-in-law of Philippe Égalité and thus grandmother to the future Louis-Philippe of France.

Youth (1726–1744)

Maria Teresa Felicitas was born on 6 October 1726 at the Ducal Palace of Modena in Modena, Italy. She was the eldest daughter of Francesco III, Duke of Modena and Charlotte Aglaé d'Orléans. Before her birth, her parents had two sons, Alfonso and Francesco, both of whom died in 1725.

Her parents' marriage was not happy and her mother eventually returned to her native France. The Duchess took up residence in the Luxembourg Palace in Paris, with the permission of Louis XV. It was while her mother was in France that she saw the opportunity to marry her daughters into the royal family; such alliances between princes du sang and princesses from a small Italian duchy was highly unexpected. Maria Teresa was engaged to her second cousin, Louis Jean Marie de Bourbon, Duke of Penthièvre. Her younger sister, Maria Fortunata, would also become a member of the French royal family in 1759 through her marriage to another cousin, Louis François Joseph, Prince of Conti.

Marriage and death (1744–1754)

The Duke of Penthièvre was Maria Teresa's mother's first cousin. Charlotte Aglaé's mother was the sister of the duke's father, Louis Alexandre, Count of Toulouse. The wedding took place on December 29, 1744 in Modena, followed by another ceremony at the Palace of Versailles. The Duke had inherited a great fortune when his father died in 1737. According to some contemporaries, their marriage was a very happy one. 

The couple's happiness would come to an abrupt end with the death of Maria Teresa on April 30, 1754, a day after giving birth to their seventh child, Louis Marie Félicité, who also died shortly after. After her death, her mother tried to arrange a marriage between her widower and her younger sister, Princess Matilde. However, the grieving duke declined the offer and never remarried.

Issue
Maria Teresa and her husband had seven children, but only two survived infancy:

Louis Marie, Duke of Rambouillet (Palace of Versailles, 2 January 1746 – Palace of Versailles, 13 November 1749), died in infancy.
Louis Alexandre, Prince of Lamballe (Hôtel de Toulouse, Paris, 6 September 1747 – Château de Louveciennes, 6 May 1768), married Princess Marie Louise of Savoy and had no issue.
Jean Marie, Duke of Châteauvillain (Hôtel de Toulouse, Paris, 17 July 1748 – Hôtel de Toulouse, Paris, 19 May 1755), died in infancy.
Vincent, Count of Guingamp (Hôtel de Toulouse, Paris, 22 June 1750 – Palace of Versailles, 14 March 1752), died in infancy.
Marie Louise, Mademoiselle de Penthièvre (Hôtel de Toulouse, Paris, 18 October 1751 – Palace of Versailles, 26 September 1753), died in infancy.
Louise Marie Adélaïde (Hôtel de Toulouse, Paris, 13 March 1753 – Château d'Ivry-sur-Seine, 23 June 1821), Mademoiselle d'Ivoy and later Mademoiselle de Penthièvre. Married Philippe d'Orléans and had issue.
 Louis Marie Félicité (Château de Rambouillet, 29 April 1754 – Château de Rambouillet, 30 April 1754), died a day after his birth.

Gallery

Ancestry

References

External links
 

1726 births
1754 deaths
House of Bourbon-Penthièvre
18th-century Italian people
Modenese princesses
Deaths in childbirth
House of Este
Burials at the Chapelle royale de Dreux
Royal reburials
Daughters of monarchs